Events from the year 1967 in France.

Incumbents
 President: Charles de Gaulle 
 Prime Minister: Georges Pompidou

Events
5 March – Legislative Election held.
12 March – Legislative Election held.
19 March – A referendum in French Somaliland favors the connection to France.
6 April – Georges Pompidou begins to form the next French government.
28 April – Elf Aquitaine petroleum brand launched.
24 July – During an official state visit to Canada, President Charles de Gaulle declares to a crowd of over 100,000 in Montreal: Vive le Québec libre! (Long live free Quebec!).
29 July – Georges Bidault moves to Belgium where he receives political asylum.
24 September – Cantonales Elections held.
1 October – Cantonales Elections held.
17 November – Author Régis Debray is sentenced to 30 years imprisonment in Bolivia.
27 November – Charles De Gaulle vetoes British entry into the European Economic Community again.
11 December – The Concorde aircraft is unveiled in Toulouse.

Arts and literature

Sport
29 June – Tour de France begins.
23 July – Tour de France ends, won by Roger Pingeon.

Births

January to March
25 January – David Ginola, soccer player.
24 February – Jean-Charles Gicquel, high jumper.
28 February – Laurence Treil, model and actress.
2 March – Thierry Lacroix, rugby union player.
6 March – Hervé Piccirillo, soccer referee.
7 March – Jean-Pierre Barda, pop star and actor.
17 March – Nathalie Marquay, beauty queen.
24 March – Philippe d'Encausse, pole vaulter.
24 March – Thierry Jarnet, jockey.
28 March – Christophe Brunet, judoka.
29 March – Nathalie Cardone, actress and singer.

April to June
3 April – Mathieu Kassovitz, director, screenwriter, producer and actor.
10 April – Bernard Pascual, soccer player.
19 April – Philippe Saint-André, rugby union player.
22 April – Valéry Grancher, Internet-based artist, performer, theorist, curator and lecturer.
24 April – Lionel Pérez, soccer player.
1 May – Nicolas Jean-Prost, ski jumper.
11 May – Patricia Chauvet, alpine skier.
22 May – Christophe Gagliano, judoka.
31 May – Sandrine Bonnaire, actress.
1 June – Olivier Delaître, tennis player.
21 June – Pierre Omidyar, entrepreneur and philanthropist/economist.
26 June 
Olivier Dahan, film director and screenwriter.
Benoît Hamon, politician and MEP

July to September
1 July – Jean-Claude Colotti, cyclist.
8 July – Stéphane Belmondo, jazz trumpeter and flugelhornist.
14 July – Valérie Pécresse, politician.
16 July – Christophe Rocancourt, impostor and con artist.
10 August – Jean-Guy Wallemme, soccer player, manager.
15 August – Frédéric Nihous, politician.
22 August – Valérie Rouzeau, poet and translator.
31 August – Stéphane Haccoun, boxer.
2 September – Fabrice Divert, soccer player.
3 September – Hubert Fournier, soccer player.
13 September – Franck Monnet, singer-songwriter.
19 September – Philippe Raschke, soccer player.
26 September – Eric Roy, soccer player.

October to December
2 October – Fabien Cousteau, aquatic filmmaker and oceanographic explorer.
7 October – Fabrice Moreau, soccer player.
13 October – Jean-Luc Dogon, soccer player.
14 November – Raphaël Piolanti, hammer thrower.
15 November – François Ozon, film director and screenwriter.
23 November – Christophe Cocard, soccer player.
5 December – Luc Jacquet, film director.
10 December – Daniel Dutuel, soccer player.
23 December – Carla Bruni, songwriter, singer and former model, third wife of French President Nicolas Sarkozy.

Full date unknown
Stéphane Allagnon, film director and screenwriter.
Hervé Cuillandre, novelist and photographer.
Isabelle Dinoire, first person to undergo a partial face transplant. (died 2016)
Benoît Lecomte, long distance swimmer.
Frédéric Lepied, computer engineer.
Quentin Meillassoux, philosopher.
Sandrine Veysset, film director.

Deaths

January to June
26 January – Eugène Le Moult, naturalist and entomologist (born 1882).
27 January – Alphonse Juin, Marshal of France (born 1888).
19 April – Julien Peridier, electrical engineer and astronomer (born 1882).
21 April – André-Louis Danjon, astronomer (born 1890).
26 April – Jean Alexandre Barré, neurologist (born 1880).
26 June – Françoise Dorléac, actress (born 1942).

July to December
11 July – André Giriat, rower and Olympic medallist (born 1905).
25 July – Pierre Albert-Birot, author (born 1876).
28 July – Paul Rassinier, pacifist, political activist and author (born 1906).
1 August – Jacques Suzanne, painter, artist and explorer (born 1880).
12 August – Antoine Gilles Menier, businessman and municipal politician (born 1904).
18 August – Paule Maurice, composer (born 1910).
27 August – Henri-Georges Adam, engraver and sculptor (born 1904).
11 September – Georges Saillard, actor (born 1877).
18 September – Marcel Rey-Golliet, boxer (born 1893).
20 September – Henri Mulet, organist and composer (born 1878).
25 September – Octave Denis Victor Guillonnet, painter (born 1872).
9 October – André Maurois, author and man of letters (born 1885).
13 October – Georges Sadoul, journalist and cinema writer (born 1904).
14 October – Marcel Aymé, novelist and children's writer (born 1902).
30 October – Julien Duvivier, film director (born 1896).
6 November – Jean Dufay, astronomer (born 1896).

Full date unknown
Stéphane Boudin, interior designer (born 1888).
Marguerite Huré, stained glass artist (born 1895).
Marcelle Lalou, Tibetologist (born 1890).
Théodore Eugène César Ruyssen, historian of philosophy and pacifist (born 1868).

See also
 List of French films of 1967

References

1960s in France